LCHR may refer to:

Latvian Centre for Human Rights, a non-governmental organization
Lowcountry Highrollers, an American roller derby league
lutropin/choriogonadotropin receptor, a transmembrane receptor